KVLY (107.9 MHz) is a commercial FM radio station licensed to Edinburg, Texas, and serving the Rio Grande Valley.  The station is currently owned by Entravision Communications and broadcasts an adult contemporary radio format, switching to Christmas music for part of December.  It shares studios and offices on North Jackson Road in McAllen with its sister stations: KFRQ, KKPS and KNVO-FM.

KVLY has an effective radiated power (ERP) of 100,000 watts, the maximum for most FM stations in the U.S.  The transmitter is on East Levee Road South in Scissors, Texas.

History

Beautiful Music
On , the station first signed on the air. It was owned by Lloyd Hawkins, with the call sign KESI, representing an easy listening format.  It was automated, carrying beautiful music supplied by Bonneville.  KESI played quarter hour sweeps of soft, mostly instrumental cover versions of popular songs, as well as Broadway and Hollywood show tunes.  Hawkins also owned KURV 710 AM.

After a fire destroyed the building housing both stations, Hawkins sold KESI to Henry B. Tippie. Tippie purchased the Yazoo lawnmower sales and service building and renovated it using the plans of chief engineer Mike Hales, who also designed the studios of KURV after the fire. Tippie then purchased radio station KRIO 910 AM in McAllen and also KNCN "C101" in Corpus Christi, Texas.  In 1979, KESI switched its call letters to KVLY, representing the Rio Grande ValLeY.

Adult Contemporary
As the beautiful music format began to age in the 1980s, KVLY made the transition to soft adult contemporary and eliminated the instrumental music.  It played well-known adult hits dating back to the 1960s, including a nightly "Love Songs" program.  "Love Songs" was hosted by Rennae Valentine (Ivy Easterly), airing 60s, 70s, and 80s hit love ballads.  Callers wishing to make special dedications could ask for specific titles.  Rennae Valentine left in 2007 for Clear Channel’s (now iHeartMedia) KTEX in Weslaco, Texas.

In 2008, KVLY cancelled "Love Songs" (which by then aired on Sunday–Thursday nights) in favor of more upbeat music and the new Top 8 at 8:00.  At this point, KVLY was classified as a Hot Adult Contemporary radio station with a target audience of adults 18–49.

On August 31, 2009, KVLY moved the Billy Bush show to 10pm in favor of a new local love songs program titled Heartbeats, airing from 7 to 10pm (Monday–Friday nights). The Billy Bush show returned to the 7pm – 11pm hours in July 2010.

Top 40 era (2010–2020)
In August 2010, the station started playing more top hits, becoming more of a Mainstream Top 40. This was done in order to compete with rivals KBFM and XHAVO-FM. Mediabase & Nielsen BDS moved KVLY to the Contemporary Hit Radio panel by February 2011.

In April 2011, KVLY ushered in a new program branded as "The Nightly Hook-Up" which consisted of the only live music mixing week nights and during the weekends. This was done in order to compete with rival KBFM and their pre-recorded mixshow in the evenings. The original programming for "The Nightly Hook-Up" began from the 10pm – midnight slot weeknights and 6pm – midnight on Saturday nights. The show was eventually added to the 5pm hour weekdays in order to counter other rival's shows at this time.

On September 19, 2011, the station saw an increase in listeners and "The Nightly Hook-Up" was moved to the prime time slot weeknights during the premiere of "Nani's Neighborhood" from 8pm – 10pm, while keeping all other original times of "The Nightly Hook-Up" as established, thus sparking a "mix war" with rival KBFM. "The Nightly Hook-Up" was the only "live" mixshow in the McAllen-Brownsville-Harlingen market that allows listeners to instantly call in and request a song to be "mixed" in.

In August 2011, Entravision Communications added Radio Production Director, AJ Leal to head up the Valley's only live mid-day program in the McAllen-Brownsville-Harlingen Radio market, instituting a new show, "New At Noon" in Spring 2012. The show's mission is to introduce never-before-heard songs (soon to be released for Radio play) first. In 2012, Program Director Alex Duran, gave the go-ahead to utilize AJ Leal's production capabilities to energize the imaging effect of 107.9 Mix FM and introduced a new "Mainstream Top 40" sound.

In February 2015, AJ Leal was quietly removed from all duties at 107.9 Mix FM due to legal issues and was replaced with other on-air personalities filling in the noon spot.

Unlike many Top 40 radio stations, the station included some reggaeton and bachata songs (which are often played on some Spanish radio stations).

In December 2017, the staff was notified of budget cuts and thus led to the release of several on-air talents from KVLY and sister stations within the company. KVLY began carrying The Kidd Kraddick Morning Show from KHKS Dallas, replacing the local morning show of Alex and Meridee.

Second Adult Contemporary era (2020–present)
On April 13, 2020, KVLY changed its format from contemporary hit radio back to the previous adult contemporary format, branded as "107.9 RGV FM". The change came two weeks after sister station KKPS changed its format from Regional Mexican to Bilingual Rhythmic CHR. Sister station KFRQ also shifted its format from Active rock to Classic rock the same day but retained the “Q94.5” name. With the change, The Kidd Kraddick Morning Show was dropped and long time afternoon host Roxy was moved to mornings. KVLY had previously aired the AC format under the “Mix 107.9” name from the early 2000s until the late 2000s.

KVLY is one of the few AC stations across the country to not have jingles on its station.

On September 16, 2021, the station started airing “The 80’s at 8”, Monday–Friday at 8 am. The program is currently hosted by Roxy. In addition, the station started adding more 80’s songs to its playlist.

Christmas music
KVLY flipped to Christmas music on November 27, 2020, joining the many AC stations across the country that had already made the switch to 24/7 Christmas music in early November.  That made it the first Rio Grande Valley radio station to play all Christmas music, since 2016 when Hot AC-formatted station KHKZ (owned by iHeartMedia) discontinued the tradition.

For the 2021 holiday season, the station did not switch to 24/7 Christmas music in November, choosing to flip to Christmas music on December 12, 2021 instead. 

For the 2022 holiday season the station switched to 24/7 Christmas music on December 1, 2022.

Branding and Slogans
KVLY's branding name was Mix 107.9 KVLY, but in March 2009 the brand was switched to 107.9 Mix FM. In April 2020, the station changed the branding name to 107.9 RGV FM.

KVLY's slogan was "The Most Hit Music", but in January 2009 the slogan was changed to "The Valley's #1 Hit Music Station".  It changed once again in August 2009 to "Today's Modern Music". The slogan "The Valley's #1 Hit Music Station" was reintroduced in 2011 and "The Valley's Hit Music Channel" was added in mid-2012.

With the station changing back to its previous AC format, the “More Hits. More Variety.” slogan was introduced in April 2020.

Previous logo

References

External links

VLY
Mainstream adult contemporary radio stations in the United States
Edinburg, Texas
Entravision Communications stations
Radio stations established in 1974
1974 establishments in Texas